Sheldon Jay Plager (born May 16, 1931, Long Branch, New Jersey) is a Senior United States circuit judge of the United States Court of Appeals for the Federal Circuit.

Early life and education
Born in Long Branch, New Jersey to A.L. and Clara Plager, Plager was educated in the public schools. He received his Artium Baccalaureus degree from the University of North Carolina in 1952, and his Juris Doctor from the University of Florida College of Law in 1958, with high honors, followed by a Master of Laws from Columbia Law School in 1961. He was in the United States Navy from 1948 to 1970, being commissioned as an ensign in 1952 and serving in active duty following World War II, earning the rank of Commander before he retired.

Career

Plager taught as a law professor at the University of Florida from 1958 to 1963, then at the University of Illinois College of Law until 1977, and was then a dean and professor at the Indiana University Maurer School of Law until 1984. He also taught as a visiting professor at the University of Wisconsin Law School, and he was a visiting scholar at Stanford Law School. From 1986 to 1987, he was counselor to the undersecretary of the United States Department of Health and Human Services, followed by three years holding various positions in the Office of Management and Budget.

Federal judicial service

Plager was nominated by President George H. W. Bush on September 12, 1989, to a seat on the United States Court of Appeals for the Federal Circuit vacated by Shiro Kashiwa, and he was confirmed by the United States Senate on November 8, 1989. He received his commission on November 11, 1989. Plager assumed senior status on November 30, 2000, and continues to sit as a Senior United States Circuit Judge. In addition to his teaching and judicial activities, he has authored numerous articles and books.

See also
 G. L. Christian and Associates v. United States

References

External links

 Official Biography on the Federal Circuit website

1931 births
Living people
20th-century American judges
21st-century American judges
Columbia Law School alumni
Fredric G. Levin College of Law alumni
Judges of the United States Court of Appeals for the Federal Circuit
Deans of law schools in the United States
United States court of appeals judges appointed by George H. W. Bush
University of Florida faculty
University of Illinois faculty
University of North Carolina alumni